The Nelson and Company Historic District is a U.S. historic district (designated as such on September 20, 2001) located in Oviedo, Florida. The district runs from 110 through 166 East Broadway Street and 30 through 110 Station Street. It contains 4 historic buildings.

Gallery

References

External links

 Seminole County listings at National Register of Historic Places

National Register of Historic Places in Seminole County, Florida
Historic districts on the National Register of Historic Places in Florida